Maegan Lynn Rosa (born February 19, 1992) is an American-born Canadian professional soccer player who plays for Houston Dash of the NWSL.

Club career

FC Kansas City, 2014
Rosa was drafted by FC Kansas City in the fourth round of the 2014 NWSL College Draft.

UMF Stjarnan, 2014
Rosa was transferred to Stjarnan later in 2014 where she played in eight games and scored four goals.

Åland United, 2015
Rosa signed with Åland United in 2015 where she started in 19 of her 20 games with the team.

FC Kansas City, 2017
Rosa signed with FC Kansas City in April 2017.

Utah Royals FC, 2018
Rosa was added to the roster of the Utah Royals FC after FC Kansas City ceased operations. On June 20, 2018 Rosa was released from the Utah Royals after zero appearances on the field.

Atalanta Mozzanico, 2019
On December 5, 2018 signed in the Serie A for Atalanta Mozzanica Calcio Femminile Dilettantistico. She played her debut on January 26, 2019 after a sub in for Sofia Colombia, in Minute 62 and scored, in her first game, 10 ten minutes after her substitution, in a 2:2 draw at U.P.C. Tavagnacco.  She made a total of 9 appearances, scoring 8 goals for the club.

Reign FC, 2019
On May 3, 2019 Rosa was signed by the Reign as a national team replacement player. She made her debut as a substitute against the Washington Spirit the following day. On July 15, 2019, Rosa was released by the club.

CF Florentia, 2019
Rosa joined Italian club Florentia in 2019.

Houston Dash, 2020–
On January 17, 2020 Rosa was signed by the Houston Dash.

International career
In November 2017, Rosa received her first her first call up to the Canadian Women's National Team as her Dad hails from Toronto. She earned her first cap on November 9, 2017 in a friendly against the United States at BC Place in Vancouver, BC.

Personal life
She married Luis Rosa in December 2020.

References

External links
 
Marquette player profile
 

1992 births
Living people
American women's soccer players
FC Kansas City players
National Women's Soccer League players
FC Kansas City draft picks
Maegan Kelly
Maegan Kelly
Åland United players
Kansallinen Liiga players
Marquette Golden Eagles women's soccer players
American sportspeople of Canadian descent
Citizens of Canada through descent
Soccer players from Kansas City, Missouri
Canadian women's soccer players
Canada women's international soccer players
OL Reign players
Women's association football midfielders
Florentia San Gimignano S.S.D. players
Expatriate women's footballers in Italy
Serie A (women's football) players
Canadian expatriate sportspeople in Italy
Houston Dash players